King Lear is a 2008 television film based on the William Shakespeare play of the same name, directed by Trevor Nunn. It was broadcast on More4 in the UK on Christmas Day, and shown on PBS' Great Performances in the United States in March 2009. The production was filmed mainly at Pinewood Studios in England.

It features the same cast and director as the 2007 RSC production, and started filming only a few days after the final performance at the New London Theatre, at Pinewood Studios in Buckinghamshire. The film was released on DVD in the UK and then in the US on 21 April 2009.  It was shown on Channel 4 on 26 December 2008, as well as being broadcast on PBS in 2009 and a number of other TV stations internationally, including NHK Japan.

Cast and crew

Cast

 Ian McKellen – King Lear
 Romola Garai – Cordelia
 William Gaunt – Earl of Gloucester
 Jonathan Hyde – Earl of Kent
 Philip Winchester – Edmund
 Sylvester McCoy – The Fool

 Frances Barber –  Goneril
 Monica Dolan – Regan
 David Weston – A Gentleman
 Guy Williams – Duke of Cornwall

Seymour Matthews – Curan
John Heffernan – Oswald

Ben Meyjes – Edgar
 Julian Harries – Duke of Albany
Naomi Capron – Maid
 Kieran Bew – Soldier
 Peter Hinton- Duke of Burgundy
 Ben Addis – King of France

Crew

Director – Trevor Nunn
Producer – Richard Price

Line Producer – Andy Picheta
Cinematographer – Paul Wheeler

Production history
King Lear started filming only a few days after the final stage performance on 12 January 2008. Filming at Pinewood Studios lasted for around a month.

Whilst McKellen appeared fully nude in the original production, PBS would not allow this on screen, so he appeared only partially nude in the televised production.

See also
 King Lear – Original Production History

References

External links
 Interview with Sir Ian McKellen on playing King Lear

 
 Watch the Play

2008 television films
2008 films
British television films
Films based on King Lear
Films directed by Trevor Nunn
2000s English-language films